Yarbo is a village in the Canadian province of Saskatchewan within the Rural Municipality of Langenburg No. 181 and Census Division No. 5. The village is located 24 km south of the Town of Churchbridge on Highway 80.

History 
Yarbo incorporated as a village on July 1, 1964.

Demographics 

See also
List of communities in Saskatchewan
Villages of Saskatchewan

References

Villages in Saskatchewan
Langenburg No. 181, Saskatchewan
Division No. 5, Saskatchewan